Ana Jelenčić (born 8 June 1994) is a Croatian professional footballer who plays as a left back for Italian Serie A club Parma and the Croatia women's national team.

Club career
Jelenčić joined a women's football team as a complete beginner when she was 13 years old. As a young player she spent a short, unhappy spell at BV Cloppenburg of the 2. Frauen-Bundesliga, then moved to Poland on the recommendation of her Croatian team-mate Leonarda Balog. In 26 Ekstraliga Kobiet appearances for Zagłębie Lubin, Jelenčić scored one goal and received eight yellow cards. She then moved to Lithuanian UEFA Women's Champions League contestants Gintra-Universitetas, before returning to Polish football with AZS PWSZ Wałbrzych in February 2017.

Although she was successful in Poland, Jelenčić transferred to Norwegian Toppserien club Avaldsnes IL in 2019 because she wanted to test herself at a higher level and earn better wages. She was soon unhappy at a shortage of first-team football, so moved to Sporting Huelva where her appearances were curtailed by the COVID-19 pandemic in Spain.

International career
Jelenčić has been capped for the Croatia national team, appearing for the team during the 2019 FIFA Women's World Cup qualifying cycle.

She progressed through the national youth teams where she had enjoyed working with the coach Dean Klafurić. She made her senior national team debut in May 2011, as a substitute in a 1–1 draw with Hungary.

References

External links
 
 
 

1994 births
Living people
Croatian women's footballers
Croatia women's international footballers
Croatian expatriate sportspeople in Spain
Expatriate women's footballers in Spain
Women's association football defenders
Hellas Verona Women players
Expatriate women's footballers in Italy
Croatian expatriate sportspeople in Italy
Sporting de Huelva players
Serie A (women's football) players
ŽNK Dinamo-Maksimir players
ŽNK Osijek players
ŽNK Agram players
BV Cloppenburg (women) players
Expatriate women's footballers in Germany
Croatian expatriate sportspeople in Germany
2. Frauen-Bundesliga players
Parma Calcio 2022 players
Toppserien players
Avaldsnes IL players
Expatriate women's footballers in Norway
Croatian expatriate sportspeople in Norway
Górnik Łęczna (women) players
Expatriate women's footballers in Poland
Croatian expatriate sportspeople in Poland
Gintra Universitetas players
Croatian expatriate sportspeople in Lithuania
Expatriate women's footballers in Lithuania
Croatian expatriate women's footballers